Polish Military Organization of the Upper Silesia was a secret military organization formed in February 1919 in Upper Silesia. It was involved in the three Silesian Uprisings, although officially it was disbanded after the Second Uprising. It had over 20,000 members, including Alfons Zgrzebniok, Jan Wyglenda, Stanisław Krzyżowski, Walenty Fojkis, Karol Grzesik, Rudolf Kornke, Wolfgang Kornke, Maksymilian Iksal.

The organization was composed of six inspectorates:
 Inspectorate – Bytom, Katowice, Królewska Huta, Zabrze;
 Inspectorate – Pszczyna, Racibórz, Rybnik;
 Inspectorate – Gliwice, Tarnowskie Góry;
 Inspectorate – Lubliniec, Olesno;
 Inspectorate – Kluczbork, Opole;
 Inspectorate – Koźle, Prudnik, Strzelce Opolskie.

See also
Polish Military Organization

Military units and formations established in 1919
1919 establishments in Poland
Silesian Uprisings
Special forces of Poland